Jigi Bola  is a free eye screening and surgical operation for Lagosians. It was introduced by former Governor of Lagos State Senator Ahmed Bola Tinubu in the year 2001.

Concept
It's a blindness prevention, treatment and awareness program centered on the grass root. The program is operated under the ministry of Health in the state. The program was a statewide initiative that rotates among all the zones in the state.

The New Jigi Bola
Eleven years after Jigi Bola was launched by the administration of Senator Ahmed Bola Tinubu, Senator Gbenga Bareehu Ashafa revived the spirit of the program by distributing eyeglasses to Lagosians.

See also
Bola Tinubu

References

21st century in Lagos